The Fourth Karunakaran ministry (24 June 1991 – 16 March 1995), in the politics of India was led by Congress Leader K. Karunakaran and had 18 ministers.

Ministers

See also 
 Chief Ministers of Kerala
 Kerala Ministers

References

Karunakaran 04
Indian National Congress state ministries
Indian National Congress of Kerala
1991 establishments in Kerala
1995 disestablishments in India
Cabinets established in 1991
Cabinets disestablished in 1995